Vitali Aleksandrovich Bakulin (8 September 1983 – 20 December 2020) was a Russian professional football player.

Club career
He made his Russian Football National League debut for FC Lada Togliatti on 22 July 2002 in a game against FC Neftekhimik Nizhnekamsk. He also played in the FNL for Lada in 2003.

Death
Bakulin died in December 2020.

References

External links
 

1983 births
2020 deaths
Russian footballers
Association football midfielders
FC Lada-Tolyatti players
FC Krasnodar players
FC Armavir players